The 1995 Auburn Tigers football team represented Auburn University in the 1995 NCAA Division I-A football season.  Coached by Terry Bowden, they finished with an 8–4 record and a 5–3 mark in the Southeastern Conference (SEC).  Auburn played in the 1996 Outback Bowl at the end of the season, marking their first bowl game since 1990. The Tigers had been banned from  postseason play the previous two seasons.

Schedule

References

Auburn
Auburn Tigers football seasons
Auburn Tigers football